NK Radnik was a Croatian football club based in the town of Velika Gorica in Zagreb County. Founded in 1945, it spent its entire history in lower levels, before briefly appearing in the Croatian First Football League, the nation's top flight, between 1992 and 1994.

In the summer of 2009, the club was disbanded and merged with another local club, NK Polet Buševec, to form HNK Gorica. The newly formed club will carry on Radnik's legacy as a symbol of football in Turopolje region.

List of seasons

Football clubs in Croatia
Football clubs in Zagreb County
Sport in Velika Gorica
Defunct football clubs in Croatia
Association football clubs established in 1945
Association football clubs disestablished in 2009
1945 establishments in Croatia
2009 disestablishments in Croatia